David Daniel Álvarez Martínez (born 5 December 1985 in Honduras) is a Honduran football defender.

Club career
Nicknamed Colingo, Álvarez played for Marathón, Savio, by whom he was released before the 2009 Clausura, Hispano where he was dismissed after suffering from dengue and the Guatemalan second division before he joined Motagua in January 2011 before the 2011 Clausura. He was however immediately sidelined through injury but was able to resume playing after a month. He was released by Motagua in June 2011.

International career
He was a member of the Honduras national football team, he also played at the 2008 Summer Olympics.

References

External links
 “Colingo” Alvarez: “Hay que trabajar, aquí nadie es titular” – La Tribuna 

1985 births
Living people
Association football defenders
Honduran footballers
Footballers at the 2008 Summer Olympics
Olympic footballers of Honduras
C.D. Marathón players
Hispano players
F.C. Motagua players
Liga Nacional de Fútbol Profesional de Honduras players
Honduran expatriate footballers
Expatriate footballers in Guatemala